, sometimes called , is a Japanese term used in Zen Buddhism which expresses the phenomenon known as "awakening alone, without a master".

Etymology
Mushi-dokugo (無師独悟) is a Japanese term composed of four Chinese characters, or kanji, meaning "independent realization without a master." The character mu (無) means "without" or "no", shi (師) means "master" or "teacher", doku (独) means "independent" or "alone", and go (悟) means "realization" or "understanding" (satoru), also translated as "enlightenment" (satori). When strung together, the characters literally read, "no (無) master (師) independent (独) understanding (悟)." The equivalent Chinese pronunciation is wúshī dúwù.

Examples
Nōnin (died 1196) is an example of mushi-dokugo:

During the Edo period in Japan, there were a great many priests who proclaimed to be "self-enlightened." These included "such notables as the Myōshin-ji masters Daigu, Ungo, Isshi and the Sōtō priest Suzuki Shōsan."

The famous Korean master Jinul could also be seen as an example.

Statements
According to William Bodiford, it is "usually considered suspect since the risk of self-delusion or "fake-Zen" is always high. ... To guarantee that his experience of the truth of Buddhism is genuine, the Zen disciple relies upon his teacher to authenticate and formally acknowledge his enlightenment."

Dōgen, the founder of the Sōtō school of Japanese Zen, acknowledged in his lifetime that such a phenomenon exists. According to Hee-Jin Kim,

Critical, reflective thinking as an integral part of meditation is mentioned in the fascicles of the Shōbōgenzō. Anyone practising alone or together, without dharma transmission, may be regarded a dharma practitioner:

See also
Pratyekabuddha
Mushin
Daigo
Dharma transmission
Jiriki
Kenshō
Satori
Enlightenment in Buddhism

Notes

References

Web reference

Sources

 

 
 

Zen
Nondualism